The Wabuska Railroad Station, on S. Carson St. in Carson City, Nevada, was built in 1906.  It was a work of the Southern Pacific Co.  It was listed on the National Register of Historic Places in 1984.

It is a  building that was located in the small community of Wabuska, Nevada, in Mason Valley, on the Southern Pacific Railroad branch line between Hazen, Nevada and Mina, Nevada.  The Wabuska Hotel and Bar (c. 1883) was nearby.

It was donated by the Southern Pacific Transportation Company in 1982 to the Nevada State Railroad Museum and was moved in 1983.  In 1984, the station was weathered but appeared in good condition structurally; photos in 2012 show that it has been improved.

References 

Railway stations in the United States opened in 1906
National Register of Historic Places in Carson City, Nevada
Railway stations on the National Register of Historic Places in Nevada
Former Southern Pacific Railroad stations in Nevada